Pictou is a Canadian town in Nova Scotia.

Pictou may also refer to:

 Pictou County, Nova Scotia, one of Nova Scotia's 18 counties
 HMCS Pictou (K146), a Flower-class corvette
 Pictou, a coastal steamship, formerly USS Fahkee
 Pictou (electoral district), a federal electoral district in Nova Scotia
 Pictou (provincial electoral district), a provincial electoral district in Nova Scotia
 Pictou Academy, a secondary school in the town of Pictou
 Pictou, Colorado, a community in the United States